Robert Carlyle may refer to:
Robert Carlyle (born 1961), British actor
Robert Warrand Carlyle (1859–1934), Indian civil servant and historian